Parasparam is a 1983 Indian Malayalam-language film, directed by Shajiyem and produced by Jose Brothers. The film stars Venu Nagavally, Zarina Wahab. The film had musical score by MB Sreenivasan.

Cast

 Venu Nagavally as Vishwanathan
 Zarina Wahab as Meera
 Nedumudi Venu as Jagadish
 Sankaradi as Appachan
 Jagathy Sreekumar as Jerry
 Kunchan as Sudheer Kumar
 Shailesh Pandey
 Rajkumar Sethupathi as Issac
 Kanakalatha as College student 
 Sukumari as Geetha's mother
 Nanditha Bose as Madam
 Sunanda as Geetha
 Jagannatha Varma as Geetha's father
 E. A. Rajendran as Jeevan
Geetha as Gracy

Soundtrack
The music was composed by M. B. Sreenivasan with lyrics by O. N. V. Kurup.

References

External links
 

1983 films
1980s Malayalam-language films